Queen Valley may refer to:
Queen Valley, Arizona
Queen Valley in Joshua Tree National Park

See also
Valley of the Queens (or "Queens Valley") in Egypt
Queen of the Valley Medical Center in Napa, California